Ivan Yuriyovych Svyda (born February 15, 1950, in Patskanovo,Uzhhorod Raion, Ukrainian SSR) is a member of the Ukrainian military, General of the Army who served as the Chief of General Staff and Commander in Chief of the Armed Forces of Ukraine. He submitted his letter of resignation from the military on 29 May 2010.

Awards 
Order of Bohdan Khmelnytsky II degree (November 29, 2005)

References

External links 
Biography. South–Ukrainian Institute of Biography.

1950 births
Living people
People from Zakarpattia Oblast
Generals of the Army (Ukraine)
Chiefs of the General Staff (Ukraine)
Military Academy of the General Staff of the Armed Forces of Russia alumni
Recipients of the Order of Bohdan Khmelnytsky, 2nd class